King City High School is a high school in King City, California, in the United States. It is administered by the South Monterey County Joint Union High School District. The school's auditorium is listed on the National Register of Historic Places.

King City FFA Chapter 

King City High School is also a member of the National FFA Organization and its chapter is currently ranked 3rd in the state of California and has been part of the school and its curriculum since 1929. The chapter has a long legacy of achievements such as being one of the first FFA Chapters in the United States to allow women in the organization and having the most proficiency award winners and state degree recipients in the state of California in 2016. 
The King City FFA Chapter also offers a wide variety of courses such as:  
 Ag Mechanics
 Ag Chemistry
 Ag Biology
 Ag Earth Science
 Ag Econ
 Ag Business 
 Horticulture
 Animal Science
 Ag Leadership

Cross country
The Mustangs have one of the top running programs in Monterey Country. By winning over 6 CCS cross country titles. In 2018, the Mustangs won three invitationals: Monterey Bay, Jackie Henderson and Chieftain-Spirit Classic. In 2018, they took second in the Stanford Invitational and third in the Mt. Sac Invitational. The 2018 team placed 3rd at a D1 race. The Mustangs took first in the PCAL championship as well in all the PCAL Center meets, also achieved to get first in CCS for their division. Then at state, they placed fourth.

Soccer

In 2022, the King City High boys soccer team won the Central Coast Section Division 4 title against Summit Preparatory High School. The soccer team also won the CIF NorCal State DV state champion against Wheatland High School.

Notable alumni
 Warren Church (Class of 1947) - Served on the Monterey County Board of Supervisors from 1965 to 1977; Father of the Monterey County parks system

References

External links

King City High School

High schools in Monterey County, California
Works Progress Administration in California
Public high schools in California
Educational institutions established in 1911
1911 establishments in California